is a Japanese male professional volleyball player from Okazaki City, Aichi Prefecture.

Ishikawa is the first volleyball player to have a wax figure in Japan. Currently, his wax figure is displayed at Madame Tussauds Tokyo.

Ishikawa was named "Best Outside Spiker" award at the FIVB World Cup (2015, 2019), Asian Championship (2017, 2019, 2021), as well as "Most Valuable Player" award at the Asian Championship (2017).

As of April 2021, Ishikawa is the captain of the Japan men's national volleyball team, and plays as an outside hitter. He currently plays in the Italian Volleyball League for Allianz Milano.

Personal life
Ishikawa's father, Mikihisa, is a former track and field sprinter of DENSO. His mother, Midori, is a former basketball player of DENSO. His elder sister, Naomi, is a former volleyball player and his sister, Mayu, is a member of the Japan women's national volleyball team.

Career

Clubs
Due to the influence of his elder sister, Ishikawa started playing volleyball in the 4th grade of Elementary School. His best achievement was an 8th place at the All Japan Volleyball Elementary School Tournament. In 2010, he won the bronze medal at the All Japan Junior High School Volleyball Championship. Then, he was selected as a captain of Aichi Prefecture, and won the silver medal at the JOC Junior Olympic Cup the same year. In High School, he became the first student to win "Triple Crown" at 3 tournaments: Inter-High, National Polity, Haruko Volley for 2 consecutive years.

In the 2014–2015 season, Ishikawa played for the Italian team Parmareggio Modena about 3 months after the end of the All Japan Intercollegiate Volleyball Championship. According to an official of the Japan Association, he was the first student to challenge an overseas league through university, and was also the first university freshman to play volleyball in the Italian Volleyball League. In the 2015–2016 season, he returned to Japan to continue playing for Chuo University's club. In December 2016, he transferred to Italy again, played for Top Volley Latina until 2018. During this time, he was an exchange student while actually still playing for his university.

After graduating from university in March 2018, Ishikawa signed his first professional contract with the Italian team Emma Villas Siena (The club was ranked up to the Italian Volleyball League in 2018–2019 season). He moved to Kioene Padova in the next season. He changed club again in 2020, to Allianz Milano. Then, he extended his contract in the 2021–2022 season, continued to stay with the club for the 2022–2023 season, and re-signed for the fourth time for the next season.

National team
In 2012, Ishikawa was called for the Japan men's national under-19 volleyball team for the first time, and the Japanese team won the bronze medal at the 2012 Asian Youth Boys Volleyball Championship in Tehran, Iran. He also won the "Best Scorer" award at the end of the tournament.

In 2013, as the national team representative, Ishikawa competed in the 2013 FIVB Volleyball Boys' U19 World Championship in Mexico, where the Japanese team finished in 17th place. He continued to compete in the 2013 FIVB Volleyball Men's U21 World Championship in Turkey the same year, where the Japanese team finished in 10th place.

In April 2014, Ishikawa entered Chuo University (Faculty of Law, Department of Political Science), and was called for the Japan men's national volleyball team for the first time. In June 2014, he was selected as a member of "Team CORE" of『Project CORE』(The project responsible for revitalizing volleyball, which was launched by the Japan Volleyball Association). In September 2014, his debut competition was at the 2014 Asian Games in Incheon, South Korea. The Japanese team won the silver medal after losing to the Iran team with a set count 1–3 in the final. In October 2014, he was part of the Japanese roster for the 2014 Asian Men's U20 Volleyball Championship in Manama, Bahrain, and led the team to win the 5th place.

In September 2015, Ishikawa participated in the 2015 FIVB Volleyball Men's World Cup in Japan for the first time. The Japanese team finished in 6th place but he still won the first "Best Outside Spiker" award of FIVB's tournament as a member of the senior national team.

In July 2017, Ishikawa participated in the 2017 Asian Men's Volleyball Championship in Gresik, Indonesia for the first time because he was not called to the tournament in 2015. The Japanese team won the gold medal, and he also won the first "Most Valuable Player, Best Outside Spiker" double award of AVC's tournament as a member of the senior national team.

In 2021, Ishikawa became the captain of the Japan men's national volleyball team, and was assigned to lead the team at the 2020 Summer Olympics in Tokyo, Japan. The Japanese team finished in 7th place after losing to the Brazil team with a set count 0–3 in the quarterfinals. In September 2021, he led the team to win the silver medal at the 2021 Asian Men's Volleyball Championship, and won the "Best Outside Spiker" award as a captain of the senior national team.

Commercial value
 Ishikawa has signed an advisory contract with Japanese brand DESCENTE and a support contract for amino acid brand「VAAM」of Meiji Co., Ltd. since 2018.
 As revealed by the President of Allianz Milano, Lucio Fusaro, there were over 60 season tickets were purchased from Ishikawa's fans in Japan and Thailand to support the team despite the fact that they could not go to Italy to watch the games live.

Health effect

Injuries
 In 2011, Ishikawa had abdominal muscle strain after the quarterfinals of the National High School Comprehensive Athletic Meet Volleyball Tournament.
 In March 2016, Ishikawa had a left knee inflammation at the training camp, where the 2016 Summer Olympics were to be played. In June 2016, he twisted his right ankle at the 1st World Olympic Qualification Tournament against Australia team.
 In September 2017, Ishikawa injured his right knee ligament at the 2017 FIVB Volleyball Men's World Grand Champions Cup against France team.
 In September 2021, Ishikawa had a backache and lower back pain before participating in the 2021 Asian Men's Volleyball Championship.
 In July 2022, Ishikawa sprained his left ankle during practice for the quarterfinals of the 2022 FIVB Volleyball Men's Nations League.

COVID-19
In December 2020, Ishikawa was positive for COVID-19 when he was playing volleyball in Italy. He recovered after nearly 20 days of home treatment. However, his taste and smell were still experiencing abnormal symptoms.

Sporting achievements

Individual

Tournament's Awards
2010 All Japan Junior High School Volleyball Championship – Excellent Player Award
2010 JOC Junior Olympic Cup – Excellent Player Award
2011 National High School Comprehensive Athletic Meet Volleyball Tournament – Excellent Player Award
2012 National High School Comprehensive Athletic Meet Volleyball Tournament – Best 6 Award
2012 National High School Comprehensive Athletic Meet Volleyball Tournament – Excellent Player Award
2012 Asian Youth Volleyball Championship – Best Scorer
2013 All Japan Volleyball High School Championship – Excellent Player Award
2013 All Japan Volleyball High School Championship – Most Valuable Player
2013 National High School Comprehensive Athletic Meet Volleyball Tournament – Best 6 Award
2013 National High School Comprehensive Athletic Meet Volleyball Tournament – Excellent Player Award
2014 All Japan Volleyball High School Championship – Excellent Player Award
2014 All Japan Volleyball High School Championship – Most Valuable Player
2014 Spring Kanto University Volleyball League – Serve Award
2014 Spring Kanto University Volleyball League – New Face Award
2014 Spring Kanto University Volleyball League – Chairman's Special Award
2014 All Japan Intercollegiate Volleyball Championship – Serve Award
2014 All Japan Intercollegiate Volleyball Championship – Most Valuable Player
2015 Kurowashiki All Japan Volleyball Tournament – Young Eagle Award (Best Newcomer Award)
2015 Spring Kanto University Volleyball League – Serve Award
2015 Spring Kanto University Volleyball League – Spike Award
2015 Spring Kanto University Volleyball League – Chairman's Special Award
2015 Memorial of Hubert Jerzy Wagner – Best Receiver
2015 FIVB Volleyball Men's World Cup – Best Outside Spiker
2015 All Japan Intercollegiate Volleyball Championship – MIP Award
2015 All Japan Intercollegiate Volleyball Championship – Best Scorer
2016 1st World Olympic Qualification Tournament – Best Outside Spiker
2016 Autumn Kanto University Volleyball League  – Spike Award
2016 Autumn Kanto University Volleyball League  – Serve Award
2016 Autumn Kanto University Volleyball League  – Chairman's Special Award
2016 All Japan Intercollegiate Volleyball Championship – MIP Award
2016 All Japan Intercollegiate Volleyball Championship – Best Scorer
2016 All Japan Intercollegiate Volleyball Championship – Serve Award
2017 Asian Men's Volleyball Championship – Most Valuable Player
2017 Asian Men's Volleyball Championship – Best Outside Spiker
2017 All Japan Intercollegiate Volleyball Championship – Best Scorer
2017 All Japan Intercollegiate Volleyball Championship – Spike Award
2019 Asian Men's Volleyball Championship – Best Outside Spiker
2019 FIVB Volleyball Men's World Cup – Best Outside Spiker
2021 Asian Men's Volleyball Championship – Best Outside Spiker

University's Awards
2014–2015 61st Student Athletic Association Award【Excellent Player Award】
2014–2015 61st Student Athletic Association Award【University President's Award】
2014–2015 32nd Chuo University President's Award【Field of sports (individual)】
2015–2016 62nd Student Athletic Association Award【Excellent Player Award】
2015–2016 62nd Student Athletic Association Award【University President's Award】
2015–2016 33rd Chuo University President's Award【Field of sports (individual)】
2017–2018 64th Student Athletic Association Award【Special Award】
2017–2018 64th Student Athletic Association Award【University President's Award・Special Award】
2017–2018 35th Chuo University President's Award【Field of sports (individual)】
2021–2022 39th Chuo University President's Award【Field of sports (OB, OG)】

National team
2012 Asian Youth Volleyball Championship  3rd place
2014 Asian Games  Runner-up
2015 Memorial of Hubert Jerzy Wagner  Runner-up
2016 Asian Men's Volleyball Cup  3rd place
2017 Asian Men's Volleyball Championship  Champion
2019 Asian Men's Volleyball Championship  3rd place
2021 Asian Men's Volleyball Championship  Runner-up
2021–2022 70th Japan Sports Award「Best Award by Competition Group」– 7th place at the 2020 Summer Olympics.

Clubs

Junior high school
2010 All Japan Junior High School Volleyball Championship  3rd place
2010 National Prefectural Competition Junior High School Volleyball Tournament (JOC Junior Olympic Cup)  Runner-up

High school
2011 National High School Comprehensive Athletic Meet Volleyball Tournament (Inter-High)   3rd place
2012 National High School Comprehensive Athletic Meet Volleyball Tournament (Inter-High)  Champion
2012 National Sports Festival Volleyball Competition (National Polity)  Champion
2013 Alumni Club Activity Encouragement Award
2013 All Japan Volleyball High School Championship (Haruko Volley)  Champion
2013 Toyoake City Sports Award
2013 National High School Comprehensive Athletic Meet Volleyball Tournament (Inter-High)  Champion
2013 National Sports Festival Volleyball Competition (National Polity)  Champion
2014 Alumni Club Activity Encouragement Award
2014 All Japan Volleyball High School Championship (Haruko Volley)  Champion
2014 Toyoake City Sports Award

University
2014 Spring Kanto University Volleyball League  Champion – Ishikawa played 11 matches.
2014 All Japan Intercollegiate Volleyball Championship  Champion – Ishikawa played 6 matches. 
2014–2015 61st Student Athletic Association Award【Excellent Group Award】
2014–2015 32nd Chuo University President's Award【Field of sports (group)】
2015 Spring Kanto University Volleyball League  Champion – Ishikawa played 11 matches. 
2015 Autumn Kanto University Volleyball League  Champion – Ishikawa played 4 matches.
2015 All Japan Intercollegiate Volleyball Championship  Champion – Ishikawa played 6 matches.
2015–2016 29th Shibuya Kenichi Encouragement Award【Physical education field】
2015–2016 62nd Student Athletic Association Award【Excellent Group Award】
2015–2016 33rd Chuo University President's Award【Field of sports (group)】
2016 Autumn Kanto University Volleyball League  Champion – Ishikawa played 7 matches.
2016 All Japan Intercollegiate Volleyball Championship  Champion – Ishikawa played 6 matches.
2016–2017 63rd Student Athletic Association Award【Excellent Group Award】
2016–2017 34th Chuo University President's Award【Field of sports (group)】
2017 Spring Kanto University Volleyball League  Runner-up – Ishikawa played 4 matches.
2017 All Japan Intercollegiate Volleyball Championship  3rd place – Ishikawa played 6 matches.
2017–2018 64th Student Athletic Association Award【Effort Group Award】 – The only award of club that Ishikawa didn't contribute gold medals.

Italian
2014–2015 Italian Cup  Champion, with Parmareggio Modena
2014–2015 Italian Championship  Runner-up, with Parmareggio Modena
2020–2021 CEV Challenge Cup  Champion, with Allianz Milano

Summarizing data

Italian Volleyball League

CEV Challenge Cup

References

External links
Yuki Ishikawa’s official Instagram
Italian Volleyball League
Ishikawa, un esempio per il Giappone: “Giocatori nipponici in Italia? Dovrebbero essercene di più” at www.volleynews.it
Il Giappone è qui: Nishida contro Ishikawa, stasera si fa la storia at www.gazzetta.it

1995 births
Living people
People from Okazaki, Aichi
Sportspeople from Aichi Prefecture
Japanese men's volleyball players
Outside hitters
Asian Games medalists in volleyball
Medalists at the 2014 Asian Games
Volleyball players at the 2014 Asian Games
Asian Games silver medalists for Japan
Japanese expatriate sportspeople in Italy
Chuo University alumni
Olympic volleyball players of Japan
Volleyball players at the 2020 Summer Olympics